Feleti Mahoni (born Ma'ufanga, Nuku'alofa, 6 April 1973) is a Tongan former rugby union player who played as flanker.

Career
Mahoni debuted for the Tonga during the match against Samoa in Nuku'alofa, on 29 May 1993. He was also part of the 1995 Rugby World Cup squad coached by Fakahau Valu, however Mahoni only played the match against France, in Pretoria, where he was mistakenly sent off by the referee when his teammate Falamani Mafi stomped French player Philippe Benetton. Although not being called up in the 1999 Rugby World Cup squad, Mahoni still played for the 'Ikale Tahi, with his final cap being against Japan, in Tokyo, on 8 May 1999. At club level, Mahoni played for Fasi Ma'ufanga between 1992 and 1996, and then, he moved to Japan to play for Secom Rugguts until his retirement in 2004.
He also played for Tonga in the inaugural Rugby World Cup Sevens in 1993.

Notes

External links

1973 births
Living people
People from Tongatapu
Tongan rugby union players
Rugby union flankers
Tonga international rugby union players
Tongan expatriates in Japan